Big Branch is a  long tributary to Crabtree Creek in Wake County, North Carolina and is classed as a 2nd order stream on the EPA waters geoviewer site.

Course
Big Branch rises in northern Raleigh, North Carolina that then flows south to meet Crabtree Creek across from Kiwanis Park.  It is a developed watershed with only 7% of the watershed considered to be forested.

Watershed
Big Branch drains  of area.  The upper part of the watershed is underlaid by Falls Leucogneiss.  The middle and lower watershed is underlaid by Raleigh Gneiss geology.  The watershed receives an average of 46.5 in/year of precipitation and has a wetness index of 415.15.

See also
List of rivers of North Carolina

External links
 Raleigh Nature Article on Big Branch

References

Rivers of North Carolina
Rivers of Wake County, North Carolina
Tributaries of Pamlico Sound